The Byram River is a  long river spanning southeast New York state and southwestern Connecticut in the United States.  It has a  drainage basin.

The lower portion of the river is  paralleled by the Merritt Parkway in Connecticut and eventually forms the southernmost portion of the New York-Connecticut border.

Several bridges cross the river, as well as several dams controlled by the Town of Greenwich, Connecticut.

History
The Byram River was once a center of economic activity where shipbuilding and fishing were major industries. The Byram section of Greenwich lies at its southern end.

On April 15, 2007, a nor'easter flooded areas near the river on both the Connecticut and New York sides. In July 2007, Greenwich town officials gave initial approval for spending $250,000 to study drainage improvement in flood-prone areas near the river, including the idea of dredging the river.

Bridgework
As of the summer of 2007, three of these in northwest Greenwich had been identified by state inspectors as in critical need of repair, and all were scheduled for work:
Bailiwick Road — already in poor shape, the bridge was further damaged by the nor'easter of April 15, 2007. In May emergency repairs were made. A redesign of the bridge may be needed to better protect against future flooding, town officials said.
Riversville Road — Greenwich officials imposed weight restrictions on the bridge which were in effect in the summer of 2007. Dump trucks are prohibited from using it, but 10-ton box trucks and 15-ton semis are allowed. 
Sherwood Avenue — Greenwich officials imposed weight restrictions on the bridge which were in effect in the summer of 2007. Only 15-ton box trucks and 26-ton semis are allowed.

See also
List of rivers of New York
List of rivers of Connecticut

References

External links
PUBLIC HEALTH IMPLICATIONS OF DIRECT EXPOSURE TO BYRAM RIVER SEDIMENT GREENWICH, FAIRFIELD COUNTY, CONNECTICUT
The Columbia Gazetteer of North America:2000-Byram River

Rivers of Westchester County, New York
Port Chester, New York
Greenwich, Connecticut
Rivers of Fairfield County, Connecticut
Rivers of Connecticut
Rivers of New York (state)
Borders of New York (state)
Borders of Connecticut